Lillie Rose Ernst (September 14, 1870 – December 6, 1943) was an American educator. She was the mentor of the Potters, an informal group of women artists in early 20th-century St. Louis, Missouri, and the first woman to become assistant superintendent of instruction in the St. Louis public school system.

Early life
Lillie Rose Ernst was born on September 14, 1870, in St. Louis. Her family was from the middle class and she was the youngest of six children. She first attended Clay School and Ames School, and then Central High School. She went to Washington University in St. Louis, graduating magna cum laude in 1892, one of the first twelve women to graduate from this college.

She was a member of Phi Beta Kappa. As a founding member and vice-president of the Washington University Women's Alumnae Association, she received an honorary M.A. degree in 1907.

Career
Ernst was a botany teacher at Central High School and then served as principal at Cote Brilliante Elementary School from 1907 to 1920. In 1920 she told her students: 
It is our playtime that should net us re-creation, enthusiasm for work, joy for living, ever-widening fields for thought, deeper thrillings of the soul, reverence, and an ever growing consciousness and comprehension of truth and beauty and law.

In 1920 she became assistant to the Superintendent of Instruction, the first woman to hold the title in the St. Louis Public Schools system. A group of male principals organized against Ernst, believing as one said, that the promotion of a woman as superintendent "would tend to disrupt the school system". Public demonstrations followed, led by women's groups such as the League of Women Voters and members of the school board, and her nomination as superintendent was successful. In 1926 she was demoted to principal at Mark Twain High School, becoming the first woman to obtain the title of "principal" in a public high school. She returned to be assistant to the Superintendent of Instruction in 1929 until 1934, and was again demoted to principal at Blewett High School in 1934. This last position she held till 1941, when she retired at the age of 70. While assistant to the Superintendent of Instruction she advocated for the reform of the Board of Education, to improve retention of students in high schools and to create a pension plan for retired teachers. Because she was unsuccessful in establishing a pension for teachers, she took a leave of absence instead of a retirement without benefits.

Memberships
She was a member of the American Ornithologists' Union, the National Education Association National Society for the Study of Education, the Alpine Club of Canada, the League of Women Voters, the National Audubon Society, and the Humanity Club. She was an honorary member of the Wednesday Club. She was director of the St. Louis Bird Club, the St. Louis Children's Hospital (also board member), and the Urban League of St. Louis (also board member). In 1931 Ernst was listed by the Women's Advertising Club among St. Louis's 10 leading women.

The Potters

Ernst was a mentor for The Potters, an informal group of women artists aged late teens to early twenties, who published a monthly artistic and literary magazine called The Potter's Wheel between 1904 and 1907. The same Potters described themselves as "idolatrous females worshipping a yellow-haired Amazon"; they called their mentor Ernst a "blond brute...the star of our existence."

The Potters included:  
 Sara Teasdale (1884–1933) (poet)
 Caroline Risque (1883–1952) (artist) 
 Petronelle Sombart (1897–1949) (artist)
 Grace Parrish (1882–1954) (photographer) and Williamina Parrish (1880–1940) (photographer) (Parrish Sisters)
 Vine Colby (writer)
 Inez Dutro (writer)
 Celia Harris (writer) 
 Edna Wahlert (writer)
 Guida Richey (b. 1881) (writer)

Teasdale dedicated a sonnet to Ernst which begins:

Personal life

Ernst's house on 6058 Kingsbury Boulevard, St. Louis, built in 1910, was designed by architect Francis De Menil. It is part of the Skinker DeBaliviere Historic District.

Ernst never married and she lived with her two unmarried sisters. On Ernst's demeanor, Williame Drake wrote in 1989:

Formidable in her starched shirt-waists and gold-rimmed glasses, intensity of purpose, and ceaseless application to hard work. Even one of her hobbies, mountain climbing, was strenuous.

She was close to Leonora Halsted, author and fellow member of the Humanity Club, who, dying in 1929, left $20,000 to Ernst in "appreciation of her devoted care ... and my abiding love". For this reason, Ernst created the Leonora B. Halsted Scholarship for students in need at Washington University.
Ernst died in St. Louis, on December 6, 1943.

See also
List of Washington University alumni

Notes

References

External links
 

1870 births
1943 deaths
Scientists from St. Louis
19th-century American botanists
American women botanists
Washington University in St. Louis alumni
20th-century American women scientists
20th-century American educators
19th-century American women scientists
19th-century American educators
People from St. Louis
19th-century American women educators
20th-century American women educators
20th-century American botanists